Streptanus is a genus of true bugs belonging to the family Cicadellidae.

The species of this genus are found in Europe and Northern America.

Species:
 Streptanus adenticus Dlabola, 1967
 Streptanus aemulans Kirschbaum, 1868

References

Cicadellidae
Hemiptera genera